Willibald "Willy" Stejskal (25 April 1896, Vienna) was an Austrian football (soccer) player in defender role and manager.

Playing career

Club
He played for Rapid Vienna from 1914 to 1923. In this period he won with the club four national championships and once the Austrian Cup. In 1923 he also played for Wacker Wien and in 1924 he finished his Austrian career as player with Wiener AF.

After this, he moved to Australia, where he claimed that he had been for two years. It is known, that in 1928 he played for the team of the stove manufacturer Metters Limited, probably based in the Sydney suburb of Canterbury and a major force in the football of the city in that era. There he falsely claimed, having been a member of the Czechoslovak team at the 1924 Olympics.

Honours
 Championship: 1915/16, 1916/17, 1918/19, 1922/23
 Cup: 1918/19

International
He made his debut for Austria in June 1918 friendly match at home against Hungary, his sole international game.

Managerial career
He coached Modena, Slavia Sofia, FC Metz, Vigor Hamme, Gent, Cercle Brugge and Ajax.

Personal life
Willy was born in Vienna, the son of Marie Cerny and Adelbert Stejskal.

He was married to Adriene D'Hont.

References

External links

 Willibald Stejskal at RapidArchiv

1896 births
Year of death missing
Footballers from Vienna
Austrian people of Czech descent
Austrian footballers
Austria international footballers
Association football defenders
SK Rapid Wien players
Austrian football managers
Modena F.C. managers
PFC Slavia Sofia managers
Bulgaria national football team managers
FC Metz managers
K.A.A. Gent managers
Cercle Brugge K.S.V. managers
K.S.V. Waregem managers
AFC Ajax managers
Austrian expatriate sportspeople in France
Austrian expatriate sportspeople in Belgium
Austrian expatriate sportspeople in Bulgaria
Austrian expatriate sportspeople in the Netherlands
Expatriate football managers in Belgium
Expatriate football managers in Bulgaria
Expatriate football managers in France
Expatriate football managers in the Netherlands